The Humour award was presented to a comic at the Angoulême International Comics Festival from 1989 until 2001.

1980s
 1989: Les vieux copains plein de pépins by Florence Cestac

1990s
 1990: Raoul Fulgurex: Le secret du mystère by Tronchet and Gelli
 1991: Le pauvre chevalier by F'Murr
 1991 (joint winner):  L’encyclopédie des bébés part 3 by Daniel Goossens
 1992: Le Petit Spirou by Tome (author) and Janry (artist), Dupuis
 1993: Raymond Calbuth by Tronchet
 1994: Les Closh: Le grand karma by Radis and Bobo, Les Humanoïdes Associés
 1995: La vache: A mort l’homme, vive l’ozone by Johan De Moor and Stephen Desberg, Casterman
 1996: Poignées d’amour by Willem
 1997: Le démon de midi by Florence Cestac
 1998: Jean-Claude Tergal: Portraits de famille by Tronchet
 1999: Agrippine et l’ancêtre by Claire Bretécher

2000s
 2000: Blotch part 1 by Blutch, Fluide Glacial
 2001: Napoléon et Bonaparte by Rochette, Casterman
 Les années Sputnik: C’est moi le chef! by Baru, Casterman
 Dans l’cochon tout est bon by Mazan, Delcourt
 Donjon parade: Un donjon de trop by Joann Sfar, Lewis Trondheim and Emmanuel Larcenet, Delcourt
 La mort et Lao Tseu: Pas de quartier! by François Boucq, Casterman

Angoulême International Comics Festival